The following is a categorized list of alumni, as well as honorary degree recipients, of Wheaton College in Massachusetts.

Alumni

Academia
 Elizabeth Altmaier (1973), Professor of Counseling Psychology and Community and Behavioral Health, University of Iowa
 Mary Ellen Avery (1948), Thomas Morgan Rotch Professor of Pediatrics, Harvard Medical School
 Joan Copjec (1968), Professor of Modern Culture and Media, Brown University
 Faye Crosby (1969), Professor of Psychology, University of California, Santa Cruz
 Lydia Folger Fowler (1842), first female medical professor in the United States at the Rochester Eclectic Medical College
 Caroline Haven Ober (1884), founder of the Department of Romance Languages, University of Washington
 Patricia A. King (1964), Carmack Waterhouse Professor of Law, Medicine, Ethics, and Public Policy, Georgetown University
 E. Frances White (1971), Professor of Individualized Study and Social and Cultural Analysis, New York University

Arts
 Carolyn Brown (1950), choreographer
 Nick Fradiani (2008), winner of the fourteenth season of American Idol
 Nancy Hemenway Barton (1941), artist
 Mary Fickett, actress
 Lauren Henderson (2009), singer
 Catherine Keener (1983), Academy Award-nominated actress
 Molly Luce (1916), painter
 Bruce Marks (1986), director of the Boston Ballet
 Eleanor Norcross (1872), painter and founder of the Fitchburg Art Museum
 Anne-Imelda Radice (1969), art historian
 Ann Ronell (1923), composer
 Jessica Sonneborn, actress
 Callie Thorne (1991), actress
 Clenet Verdi-Rose (2004), film director
 Rose Weaver (1973), actress

Athletics
 Dan Antoniuk (2003), Major Arena Soccer League player
 Connie Carberg (1971–1972), National Football League scout
 Chris Denorfia (2002), Major League Baseball player
 Jim Manganello (1999), Major League Soccer player

Business
 Ken Babby (2002), businessman
 Ligia Bonetti (1989), businesswoman
 Evelyn Danzig Haas (1939), philanthropist
 Diane Farrell (1977), board member of the Export–Import Bank of the United States
 Janet Hanson, founder of Ellevate Network
 Denise Jefferson (1965), dancer
 Trish Karter (1977), founder of Dancing Deer Baking Co.
 Sandra Ohrn Moose (1963), advisor to the Boston Consulting Group
 Patricia Phelps de Cisneros (1969), philanthropist
 Catherine Filene Shouse (1918), philanthropist

Literature
 Lori Baker (1984), novelist
 Lesley Bannatyne (1975), author
 Linda Barlow, author
 Gwenda Blair (1960–1961), author
 Harriet Connor Brown, author
 Kay Chorao (1958), children's writer
 Jean Fritz (1937), children's writer
 Robie Harris (1962), children's writer
 Allen J. Hubin, literary critic
 Peter W. Kunhardt Jr. (2005), author
 Nancy Mairs (1964), essayist
 Susan Meddaugh (1966), children's writer
 Estelle M. H. Merrill (1877), journalist
 Marion Naifeh (1950), author
 Esther Newberg (1963), literary agent
 Margaret Colby Getchell Parsons (1914), author
 Jean Pedrick (1943), author
 Sally Bedell Smith (1970), journalist
 Lesley Stahl (1963), journalist
 Mari Tomasi, novelist
 Amanda Urban (1968), literary agent

Politics
 Mimi Alford (1965), White House intern, who had an affair with United States President John F. Kennedy
 Anne Canby, Commissioner of the New Jersey Department of Transportation
 Giovinella Gonthier (1972), Seychelles Ambassador to the United States
 Shad Al-Sherif Pasha (2001), Sharif of Hijaz
 Ellen Moran (1988), former White House Communications Director under United States President Barack Obama
 Barbara Richardson (1971), First Lady of New Mexico and wife of Bill Richardson
 Gale Rossides, acting director of the Transportation Security Administration
 Margaret Joy Tibbetts (1941), United States Ambassador to Norway
 Candy Waites (1965), member of the South Carolina House of Representatives
 Jigme Khesar Namgyel Wangchuck (1999–2001), King of Bhutan
 Christine Todd Whitman (1968), Governor of New Jersey

Other
 Louise Bates Ames (1926–1928), psychologist
 Mark Baumer (2006), adventurer
 Ron Corning (1993), television news reporter
 Barbara Damrosch (1963), horticulturalist
 Emily Susan Hartwell (1883), missionary
 Dennis Leary, chef
 Mary Johnson Bailey Lincoln (1864), chef
 Fanny E. Minot (1867), president of the Woman's Relief Corps
 Ann Peoples (1979), anthropologist
 Nedi Rivera (1968), Episcopal bishop
 Sybil Ward, attorney

Honorary
 Hattie Alexander (1967), pediatrician
 Margaret Clapp (1960), president of Wellesley College
 Emerson Greenaway (1973), president of the American Library Association
 Vartan Gregorian (1989), president of the Carnegie Corporation of New York
 Matina Horner (1979), president of Radcliffe College
 Alice S. Huang (1982), president of the American Association for the Advancement of Science
 Wolf Kahn (2000), painter
 Phyllis McGinley (1956), children's writer
 Agnes Mongan (1953), director of the Harvard Art Museums
 Seiji Ozawa (1984), director of the Boston Symphony Orchestra
 Helenka Pantaleoni (1966), actress
 Richard Stengel (2011), chief executive officer of the National Constitution Center
 Rosemond Tuve (1957), Professor of English, University of Pennsylvania
 Emily Vermeule (1973), Professor of Classical Philology and Archaeology, Harvard University
 Kathryn Wasserman Davis (2009), philanthropist

References